Sebastián Miguel Miranda Córdova (born 26 August 1980) is a Chilean football manager and former player who played as a defender. He is the current manager of Universidad de Chile's youth sides.

Club career

Unión Española
Miranda began his professional career in 1996 after joining the Unión Española youth team. In 1998, he was called up to Unión Española's first team, who were then coached by Guillermo Yávar. The 1999 season marked the arrival of Juvenal Olmos as coach. He sent Miranda on loan to Ñublense, then of the Chilean Third Division, in order for him to gain first team experience. He remained there for two years until being recalled by Unión Española in preparation for their 2001 season in Primera Division. He made his first team debut for Unión Española in the 2001 season against Colo-Colo, and became a regular starter for Union for the next years. In 2004, he was named co-captain prior to the team's Apertura campaign.

During the 2005 Apertura, Miranda played a key role in guiding Unión Española to the 2005 Torneo Apertura. However, Miranda had already agreed a loan to Red Bull Salzburg of Austria for the rest of the 2005-2006 European season, preventing him in partaking in the 2005 Apertura play-offs, where Unión Española won their sixth national title in team history. Miranda made only 4 appearances for Salzburg before returning to Unión Española after the season's end. In 2006, he stayed with Unión Española throughout the 2006 Apertura before being sold to rivals Universidad Católica at the start of the 2006 Clausura.

Universidad Católica
After his transfer to UC, Miranda started in 11 games in defense during the Clausura, before injuring his ACL in his right knee, an injury that would keep him out for 9 months. He would go on to miss the 2006 Torneo Clasura where Universidad Católica would bow out during the playoffs and all of the 2007 Apetura and its Torneo where Universidad Católica lost to Colo-Colo in the final. He made his return during the 2007 Clausura where he made 11 appearances, 4 from the bench. Again, UC lost in the playoffs, after which, he left the club.

Return to Unión Española
In the off season, Miranda returned to Unión Española where he became a fixture in the back. After the retirement of José Luis Sierra before the 2009 Apertura he was named the new club captain. The team narrowly missed out on the title that season, losing to Universidad de Chile 3-2 on aggregate in the 2009 Torneo Apertura Finals. Because of their runners up finish, Unión Española qualified for the 2009 Copa Sudamericana, where they were eliminated by Vélez Sársfield in the Round of 16 by an aggregate score of 5-4. He continued to captain the side until the end of their 2010 Clausura.

Columbus Crew
On 24 December 2010, it was first reported by La Tercera on their website that Miranda had agreed to terms with American Major League Soccer side Columbus Crew. He made his Columbus debut on 22 February 2011, in leg 1 of the Crew's CONCACAF Champions League quarter-final series against Real Salt Lake. His first league game with the Crew was on March 19, 2011 against DC United in the season opener. He scored his first goal for the crew against F.C. Dallas with a 20-yard header.

Managerial career
Next his retirement, he worked as the manager of the academies of Unión Española at national level as well as the Football Technical Leader of the social club Estadio Español (Spanish Stadium). From February 2020 to September 2021, he was the assistant coach of Patricio Ormazábal of Chile U20 and next he joined Universidad de Chile youth system. In 2022, he took the challenge of coaching Universidad de Chile first team after Santiago Escobar was released.

Miranda was again named interim manager of U de Chile on 9 September 2022, after Diego López was dismissed. On 25 September, he was named manager until the end of the season.

On 7 November 2022, Miranda returned to La Us youth categories, as the club were looking for a new manager for the 2023 season.

Honours

Player
Unión Española
 Primera División de Chile: 2005 Apertura

References

External links

 
 

1980 births
Living people
Footballers from Santiago
Chilean footballers
Chilean expatriate footballers
Unión Española footballers
Ñublense footballers
FC Red Bull Salzburg players
Club Deportivo Universidad Católica footballers
Columbus Crew players
Everton de Viña del Mar footballers
Chilean Primera División players
Primera B de Chile players
Austrian Football Bundesliga players
Major League Soccer players
Expatriate footballers in Austria
Chilean expatriate sportspeople in Austria
Expatriate soccer players in the United States
Chilean expatriate sportspeople in the United States
Association football defenders
Chilean football managers
Universidad de Chile managers
Chilean Primera División managers